Vodyanovka is a rural locality (a selo) in Yevpraksinsky Selsoviet, Privolzhsky District, Astrakhan Oblast, Russia. The population was 797 as of 2010. There are 24 streets.

Geography 
Vodyanovka is located 28 km south of Nachalovo (the district's administrative centre) by road. Yevpraksino is the nearest rural locality.

References 

Rural localities in Privolzhsky District, Astrakhan Oblast